Breeders and fanciers of chickens accurately describe the colours and patterns of the feathers of    chicken breeds and varieties. This is a list of the terms used in this context.

Self 
Self chickens are one-coloured, i.e. lacking a pattern. Show quality strains may have even pigmentation throughout the outer plumage, production or pet quality strains are likely to not.

Barred and cuckoo

Columbian, belted

Duckwing

Laced

Pencilled

Mottled, spangled, mille fleur

Black-tailed

Black-breasted

Others

References

See also 
 Equine coat colour
 List of poultry feathers
 Lavender (chicken plumage)
 Solid black (chicken plumage)
 Solid white (chicken plumage)

Chickens
Bird colours
Chicken plumage patterns
Poultry
Chicken